The 57th Army was a field army of the Soviet Union's Red Army that was created in 1941, and then disbanded and created a second time in 1943. The 57th Army was employed by the Soviets in the fight against Germany during World War II.

History

First formation 
The 57th Army was formed in October 1941 and subordinated to the Reserve of the Supreme High Command (RVGK). Still under RVGK control in December 1941, the 57th Army was made up of the following units.

333rd Rifle Division
335th Rifle Division
337th Rifle Division
341st Rifle Division

349th Rifle Division
351st Rifle Division
60th Cavalry Division
79th Cavalry Division

During the May 1942 Battle of Kharkov, the army was surrounded and practically destroyed. Attempting to break out, General Podlas, the army commander, was killed in action. Slowly rebuilt, by December 1942, the army was part of the Stalingrad Front. The 57th Army was disbanded in February 1943 to form the headquarters of the 68th Army.

Second formation 
The 57th Army was formed a second time in April 1943 and subordinated to the Southwestern Front. The 68th Rifle Corps first appears in Soviet OOB 1 August 1943, as part of the 57th Army, Southwestern Front. Subordinate divisions at this time were the 19th, 52nd, and 303rd Rifle Divisions.
The army subsequently fought in the Ukraine, Romania, Bulgaria, Yugoslavia, and Hungary until the end of the war. During the final months of the war, the army occupied the southernmost position of the Soviet front line; to the south of 57th Army on the eastern front were Bulgarian (including the Bulgarian First Army) and Yugoslavian forces. At war's end, the 57th Army was subordinated to the 3rd Ukrainian Front, and commanded the following forces.

Infantry units
6th Guards Rifle Corps
10th Guards Airborne Division
20th Guards Rifle Division
61st Guards Rifle Division
64th Rifle Corps
73rd Guards Rifle Division
113th Rifle Division
299th Rifle Division
133rd Rifle Corps
84th Rifle Division
104th Rifle Division
122nd Rifle Division

Artillery units
160th Gun-Artillery Brigade
42nd Guards Corps Artillery Regiment
374th Antitank Regiment
523rd Mortar Regiment
71st Anti-Aircraft Regiment

Engineer units
65th Engineer-Sapper Brigade

The 57th Army became part of the Southern Group of Forces when it was formed in June 1945. It was stationed in Romania with its headquarters at Craiova. On 10 June 1946 the 57th Army became the 9th Mechanized Army. It included the 19th Tank Division, 20th Mechanized Division, 24th Guards Mechanized Division, and the 6th Guards Rifle Corps. In December the 6th Guards Rifle Corps was disbanded, along with two of its divisions. In early 1947 the 19th Tank Division was moved back to the Soviet Union, where it was disbanded. On 15 July 1947 the army itself was disbanded, along with the 24th Guards and 20th Mechanized Divisions.

Commanders 
 10.1941 - 02.1942 D. I. Riabyshev
 02.1942 - 05.1942 K. P. Podlas
 05.1942 - 06.1942 A. G. Batiunia
 06.1942 - 07.1942 Dmitry Nikishov
 07.1942 - 01.1943 F. I. Tolbukhin
 04.1943 - 05.1943 Pavel Rybalko
 05.1943 - 10.1944 Nikolai Gagen
 10.1944 - 05.1945 Mikhail Sharokhin
 06.1946 - 02.1947 Colonel General Issa Pliyev
 02.1947 - 07.1947 Colonel General Nikolai Gusev

Notes

References 
 Keith Bonn, Slaughterhouse: The Handbook of the Eastern Front, Aberjona Press, Bedford, PA, 2005
 
 David Glantz, Companion to Colossus Reborn, University Press of Kansas, Lawrence, KS, 2005
 Jean-Luc Marchand, Order of Battle Soviet Army World War 2, 24 volumes, The Nafziger Collection
 Samuel J. Newland and Clayton K. S. Chun, The European Campaign: Its Origins and Conduct, U.S. Army War College SSI, Carlisle, PA, 2011 -  Online version

External links 
 http://samsv.narod.ru/Arm/arm.html - (Russian)
 Combat Composition of the Soviet Army via tashv.nm.ru

Field armies of the Soviet Union
Military units and formations established in 1941
Military units and formations disestablished in 1947